In the singles event of the 2012 Heineken Open men's tennis tournament, David Ferrer was the defending champion and confirmed his title beating unseeded player Olivier Rochus in the final, 6–3, 6–4, for his 3rd win in Auckland.

Seeds

Draw

Finals

Top half

Bottom half

Qualifying

Seeds

Qualifiers

Draw

First qualifier

Second qualifier

Third qualifier

Fourth qualifier

References
 Main Draw
 Qualifying Draw

Heineken Open - Singles
2012 Heineken Open